Stewart Francke (born September 15, 1958 in Saginaw, Michigan) is a singer/musician/songwriter in Detroit.

His most recent CD, Heartless World (released May 31, 2011) features a guest appearance by Bruce Springsteen. His album, Motor City Serenade, was recorded with the legendary Motown session band The Funk Brothers.

Francke's music has won numerous awards: nine Detroit music awards, Hour Detroit's most popular musician 2002-2004, four straight ASCAP writer's awards, and the prestigious Point of Light Award for his work in cancer care. The Stewart Francke Leukemia Foundation (SFLF) was also presented the Partnership In Humanity Award by the Detroit Newspapers, and he was awarded a Creative Artist Grant by Artserve Michigan in 2003.

A leukemia and bone marrow transplant survivor of 10 years, Francke often plays benefit concerts and donates his time to cancer support efforts. The SFLF continues to support many organizations such as Karmanos Cancer Institute, the Children's Leukemia Foundation, The National Bone Marrow Transplant Link, The Leukemia & Lymphoma Society and Gilda's Club. The priority mission of the foundation is to fund low income patients and increase marrow donation in minority communities. Francke and Broadway star Brian d'Arcy James recently raised $92,000 for the Fields Neurological Institute in their hometown of Saginaw, Michigan.

The Stewart Francke Leukemia Foundation raised approximately $200,000 by 2000. An endowment was started at Karmanos Cancer Institute, to assist individuals in finding a compatible bone marrow match.

In 2009, Stewart Francke received the 20th Anniversary Lifetime Achievement Arts Award from his hometown of Saginaw.

He lives in Huntington Woods, Michigan with his wife Julia.

Discography
 1995: Where the River Meets the Bay (Schoolkids Records)
 1996: Expecting Heroes (Wild Justice)
 1997: House of Lights (Blue Boundary Records)
 1998: Sunflower Soul Serenade (Blue Boundary Records)
 1999: Swimming in Mercury (Blue Boundary Records)
 2000: What We Talk of ... When We Talk (Blue Boundary Records)
 2001: Kiss Kiss Bang Bang: Best of Stewart Francke (Blue Boundary Records)
 2002: Wheel of Life (Blue Boundary Records)
 2005: Motor City Serenade (Zane Records)
 2008: Alive and Unplugged at The Ark (Zane Records)
 2011: Heartless World (Blue Boundary Records)
 2012: Love Implied (Blue Boundary Records 2013: A Familiar Fire (Blue Boundary Records)
 2015: Midwestern---The Best of Stewart Francke.''

References

External links 
 

American male singer-songwriters
Living people
1958 births
People from Saginaw, Michigan
People from Huntington Woods, Michigan
Singer-songwriters from Michigan